The Dr. Lindley Schooley House and Office is a Queen Anne style house in Belmont, Ohio. The house on Main Street was built around 1895 for Dr. Lindley Schooley (1824-1908).

It was added to the National Register in 1982.

History
Dr. Lindley Schooley was born in Belmont in 1824. He attended Starling Medical College in Columbus and graduated in the 1840s. He moved back to Belmont in 1851 and completed his Queen Anne-style home in 1895. He practiced medicine in the community and even held the position as president of the First National Bank of Belmont at age 78, in 1902, until his death in 1908 at the age of 84.

References

Houses in Belmont County, Ohio
National Register of Historic Places in Belmont County, Ohio
Houses on the National Register of Historic Places in Ohio
Queen Anne architecture in Ohio
Houses completed in 1895